Macrodasyida is an order of gastrotrichs. Members of this order are somewhat worm-like in form, and not more than 1 to 1.5 mm in length.

Macrodasyids are almost in entirely marine and live in the sediment in marine or brackish water, but two species have been discovered in freshwater. They can be distinguished from other gastrotrichs by the presence of two pores on either side of the pharynx, that allow excess water to be expelled during feeding. The body is dorsally flattened and there are tubular adhesive glands at both ends  and on the lateral surfaces. These animals are detritivores and are hermaphrodites.

Families
Cephalodasyidae Hummon & Todaro, 2010
Dactylopodolidae Strand, 1929
Hummondasyidae Todaro, Leasi & Hochberg, 2014
Lepidodasyidae Remane, 1927
Macrodasyidae Remane, 1924
Planodasyidae Rao & Clausen, 1970
Redudasyidae Todaro, Dal Zotto, Jondelius, Hochberg, Hummon, Kanneby & Rocha, 2012
Thaumastodermatidae Remane, 1927
Turbanellidae Remane, 1926
Xenodasyidae Todaro, Guidi, Leasi & Tongiorgi, 2006

References

Gastrotricha
Protostome orders